Turning Paige is a 2001 Canadian drama film directed by Robert Cuffley. The film focuses on the life of Paige (Katharine Isabelle) and her family as she comes to terms with tragedy in the family's past. The film's title refers to the phrase "turn the page" as the central character must come to terms with her past and put it behind her if she is to move on in life.

Plot
The plot revolves around the life of aspiring writer and high school student Paige Fleming. Paige incorporates aspects of her life into her fictional stories. Living alone with her father Ross (Nicholas Campbell) a recovering alcoholic, their lives are upset by the return of Paige's brother Trevor (Philip DeWilde) who has been absent for two years. His return forces Paige to address her life and memories of the tragic suicide of her mother.

Cast
 Katharine Isabelle as Paige Fleming
 Nicholas Campbell as Ross Fleming
 Torri Higginson as Sheila Newlands
 Brendan Fletcher as Jeff Simms
 Philip DeWilde as Trevor Fleming
 Nikki Barnett as Danielle Whitaker
 John Diamond as Steve Pettle
 Chris Kelly as Chet
 David McClelland as Chet's Dad
 Janet Monid as Woman in Woods
 Dawn McKelvie Cyr as Social Worker
 Charlie Rhindress as Chris

Nominations and awards
Turning Paige was nominated for four Genie awards in 2002; Best Actor, Best Supporting Actor, Best Music Composition and Best Art Direction. It won Best Western Canada Screenplay and Telefilm Canada Best Emerging Western Canadian Feature-Film Director at the 20th Annual Vancouver International Film Festival in 2001. It won the Alberta Film and Television Award for both Best Director, and Best Editor, Dramatic.

References

External links
 
 

2001 films
2001 directorial debut films
2001 drama films
2000s Canadian films
2000s coming-of-age drama films
2000s English-language films
2000s teen drama films
Canadian coming-of-age drama films
Canadian teen drama films
English-language Canadian films
Films directed by Robert Cuffley